Rastorf is a municipality in the district of Plön, in Schleswig-Holstein, Germany.

Rastorf is on the highway 202 about a kilometer east of Raisdorf. The white bridge over the Schwentine is one of the landmarks of the community.

References

Municipalities in Schleswig-Holstein
Plön (district)